Gelidibacter gilvus is a bacterium from the genus of Gelidibacter.

References

Flavobacteria
Bacteria described in 2005